The Australian Women's Health Network (AWHN) is the peak organisation for women's health in Australia. AWHN was formed by women who attended the inaugural Community Health Association Conference in September 1986. It was incorporated on 3 March 1994. It is a non-profit network run primarily by volunteers. AWHN is an umbrella organization for State and Territory Women's Health Networks, and other national organizations which embrace its objectives and philosophy. The AWHN National Management Committee is made up of representatives from every state and territory in Australia.  They especially aim to be universally trustworthy and to help women that are at a particularly higher risk when dealing with poor health. The organization prides itself on its accountability, transparency, integrity, and respect. They are willing to hold themselves accountable for their decisions and actions, having an open arms policy to gain the trust of the people, being able to maintain that trust, and treating each individual as an equal, not prioritizing anyone's self-worth over another. It also acts as a haven and aims to be overcome society's boundaries through inclusiveness in hopes of equity and equality. Actively participates in feminist movements, stressing the necessity and paramount of women's health. The organization outreaches to media to further shed light on the issue of women's health.

Vision and purpose 
The vision for Australia's Women Health Network came from the Women's Health Charter which has a goal of making sure every woman in Australia is safe. The charter hopes to ensure that women are free from violence and discrimination, and among all else, have equal opportunity and freedom from discrimination. This charter is the basis for the beliefs embedded within the Australian Women's Health Network and works collectively to create better opportunities for women in Australia, offering a hub of organizations and services. Their goals also work towards implicit events that may affect women's health such as social, cultural and environmental determinants of health. The Australian Women's Health Network defines their role as being “The national voice for women’s health”.

Activity
AWHN is a pro-choice organization. The 1st Australian Women's Health Conference occurred in October 1987 at the Royal Women's Hospital in Melbourne and was funded by the Department of Health. The 7th conference was held in Sydney from May 2013. Speakers at the conference included Kimberly Dark.

In 2009, AWHN received approximately $100,000 in funding from the Department of Health and Ageing.

AWHN has been funded in various ways since 1986, with a combination of government contracts and philanthropy. In 2022, AWHN had funding renewed as the Women's Health peak body through the Australian Government Department of Health, Health Peak and Advisory Bodies Program.

Not only do they advocate for women's health, they branch out to other intersecting topics such as Aboriginal and Torres Strait Islander land rights and climate change. They believe that the economy and natural disasters are connected, believing that women will be at most risk because of gender inequities.

States and Territories 
AWHN has many organizations across that country that includes: The Australian Capital Territory Women's Health Services, North Territory Women's Health Services, New South Wales Women's Health Services, South Australia Women's Health Services, Queensland Women's Health Services, Tasmania Women's Health Services, Victoria Women's Health Services, and Western Australia Women's Health Services.

Why Women's Health 
From childhood to old age, women and gender diverse people experience health, illness, and healthcare differently to men. These differences begin from birth and progress into gendered childhoods, gendered work lives, sexism and violence, sexual and reproductive health, economic insecurity, and the disproportionate demands of women including care giving and motherhood. Women have higher levels of chronic disease, poorer mental health linked to sexism, violence and chronically poor incomes. Women experience gender discrimination in healthcare which can result in delayed access to care, misdiagnosis, and neglect. Women comprise half of Australia’s population, but their burden of poor health is disproportionate. Transparency allows for better reliable sources to be found by women who seek health information rather than finding information that could be "inaccurate or misleading. Utilizing the United Nations' Convention on the Elimination of All Forms of Discrimination Against Women, AWHN advocate for investment in women's health and wellbeing as a method of anti-discrimination, violence prevention and move towards population wide health equity.

Sexual and reproductive health 

Although Australia has multiple laws and practices in place, AWHN still argues that Women's health should be a priority and that the laws that are in place require further harmonisation. The organization wants the Australian government to pinpoint the exact causes for poor women's health and address the "social determinants of sexual and reproductive ill-health". Another major issue that AWHN wants to be tackled is for there to be strict regulations and monitoring of sterilization procedures that are being performed on girls and women living with disabilities. They stress the importance of women's health yet there is an inadequate source of funding for existing programs and a lack of new programs being created to help women. In addition to new regulations being enacted, a radical change within the education system is needed. With the right take on sexuality education, it can "better prepare young people to make safe and responsible decisions about sexual activity" which prevents further spread of STIs and promote healthy lifestyles. The organization proposes that there be increase access to a variety of contraceptive options that are available to all genders. Not only do they want these options widely available, but they also want it to be more affordable.

References
Notes

Bibliography

External links
Official website

Women's organisations based in Australia
Feminist organisations in Australia
1986 establishments in Australia